The 2007 Sundance Film Festival ran from January 18 until January 28, 2007, in Park City, Utah with screenings in Salt Lake City, Utah and Ogden, Utah.  It was the 23-rd iteration of the Sundance Film Festival. The opening night film was Chicago 10; the closing night film was Life Support.

3,287 feature films were submitted, of which 1,852 were U.S films (compared to 1,764 in 2006) and 1,435 were international films (vs. 1,384 in 2006).  From these, 122 feature films were selected and include 82 world premieres, 24 North American premieres, and 10 U.S. premieres from 25 countries.  The festival had films from almost 60 first or second-time feature filmmakers.

Juries 
The juries at the Sundance Film Festival are responsible for determining the Jury Prize winners in each category and to award Special Jury Prizes as they see fit.

Jury, Independent Film Competition: Documentary
Alan Berliner, Lewis Erskine, Lauren Greenfield, Julia Reichert, Carlos Sandoval

Jury, Independent Film Competition: Dramatic
Dawn Hudson, Elvis Mitchell, Catherine Hardwicke, Pamela Martin, Sarah Polley, George C. Wolfe

Jury, World Cinema Competition: Documentary
Raoul Peck, Juan Carlos Rulfo, Elizabeth Weatherford

Jury, World Cinema Competition: Dramatic
Carlos Bolado, Lynne Ramsay, U-Wei Bin Haji Saari

Jury, Shorts Competition
Jared Hess, Daniela Michel, Mark Elijah Rosenberg

Alfred P. Sloan Feature Film Prize Jury
John Underkoffler, Darren Aronofsky, Ann Druyan, Howard Suber, Dr. Brian Greene

Films
For a full list of films appeared at the festival, see List of films at the 2007 Sundance Film Festival.

Premieres

Independent Film Competition: Documentary 
The 16 films below were chosen from 856 submissions by U.S. filmmakers and each film is a world premiere.

Independent Film Competition: Dramatic 
The 16 films below were chosen from 996 submissions and each film is a world premiere.

World Cinema Competition: Documentary 
The 16 films below were chosen from 506 submissions.

World Cinema Competition: Dramatic
The 16 films below were chosen from 506 submissions.

Frontier

Award winners 
Grand Jury Prize: Documentary - Manda Bala (Send a Bullet)
Grand Jury Prize: Dramatic - Padre Nuestro
Grand Jury Prize: World Cinema Dramatic - Adama Meshuga'at (Sweet Mud)
Grand Jury Prize: World Cinema Documentary - Vores lykkes fjender (Enemies of Happiness)
Audience Award: Documentary - Hear and Now
Audience Award: Dramatic - Grace Is Gone
World Cinema Audience Award: Documentary - In the Shadow of the Moon
World Cinema Audience Award: Dramatic - Once
Documentary Directing Award - Sean Fine and Andrea Nix Fine for War/Dance
Dramatic Directing Award - Jeffrey Blitz for Rocket Science
Excellence in Cinematography Award: Documentary - Heloisa Passos for Manda Bala (Send a Bullet)
Excellence in Cinematography Award: Dramatic - Benoit Debie for Joshua
Documentary Film Editing - Hibah Sherif Frisina, Charlton McMillan, and Michael Schweitzer for Nanking
Waldo Salt Screenwriting Award: Dramatic - James C. Strouse for Grace Is Gone
Special Jury Prize: Dramatic Performance - Jess Weixler in Teeth and Tamara Podemski in Four Sheets to the Wind
Special Jury Prize: Dramatic -  Chris Smith, director of The Pool
Special Jury Prize: Documentary - No End in Sight
Special Jury Prize: World Cinema Dramatic - L' Héritage (The Legacy)
Special Jury Prize: World Cinema Documentary - Hot House
Jury Prize in Short Filmmaking - Everything Will Be OK
Jury Prize in International Short Filmmaking - The Tube With a Hat
Honorable Mentions in Short Filmmaking - Death to the Tinman, The Fighting Cholitas, Men Understand Each Other Better (Mardha Hamdigar Ra Behtar Mifahmand), Motodrom, Spitfire 944, t.o.m.
Special Jury Prize in Short Filmmaking - Freeheld
2007 Alfred P. Sloan Prize - Dark Matter

Festival Theaters
Park City
Eccles Theatre - 1,270 seats
Egyptian Theatre - 266 seats
Holiday Village Cinemas II - 156 seats 
Holiday Village Cinemas III - 156 seats 
Holiday Village Cinemas IIV - 164 seats 
Library Center Theatre - 448 seats
Prospector Square Theatre - 352 seats
Racquet Club Theatre - 602 seats
Yarrow Hotel Theatre - Press and industry screenings
Kimball Junction
Redstone Cinemas - 185 seats
 Salt Lake City
 Broadway Centre Cinemas IV  - 211 seats
 Broadway Centre Cinemas V - 238 seats
 Broadway Centre Cinemas VI - 274 seats
 Rose Wagner Performing Arts Center - 477 seats
 Tower Theatre - 342 seats
Sundance Resort
Sundance Institute Screening Room - 164 seats
Ogden
Peery's Egyptian Theatre - 800 seats

References

External links
IMDB
2007 Sundance Film Festival daily video blog

2007 in Utah
2007
2007 film festivals
2007 in American cinema
2007 festivals in the United States
January 2007 events in the United States